Yousef Ahmed Mousa Ahmed Ali Al Baloushi (born 27 April 1994) commonly known as Yousef Ahmed, is an Emirati footballer who plays as a forward for the UAE national football team under-20.

Club career

Al Ain

2012–13 season

Career statistics

Club

Senior team

Honours

Club
Al Ain
Arabian Gulf League: 1
 2012–13

Individual 
Al Ain International Football Juniors Championship Top Goalscorer: 1
 2011
Young Player of the Year: 1
 2012–13

References

External links
Al Ain FC profile

1994 births
Living people
People from Al Ain
Al Ain FC players
Al-Wasl F.C. players
Emirati footballers
Association football forwards
UAE Pro League players
Emirati people of Baloch descent
United Arab Emirates youth international footballers